The Pathfinder Company (Parachute) is a pathfinder and reconnaissance unit within Malaysian Army's 10th Parachute Brigade (10 PARA BDE).

The unit is a small group of paratrooper who have been specially trained to carry out special operations missions for the brigade. They trained together and have good relations with other elite forces in the Malaysian Armed Forces, such as the Malaysian Army's 21st Gerup Gerak Khas and the Royal Malaysian Air Force's PASKAU. 

Major Salmuazhari Md Salleh is the current commanding officer of Pathfinder Company (Parachute), taking over from Major Huzairein Hj Yacob on 13 January 2022.

The Pandura is equivalent to the French Army's Commando Parachute Group, which serves as the pathfinder unit for the 11th Parachute Brigade.

Origin 
The unit was formed in 1995 as Platun Pandura to meet the need for an infiltration team to enter the area of operations and provide navigation assistance and movement control for the main airborne forces. On 1 June 1999, the army command formally established the Pandura as a Malaysian army unit. As the platoon grew, the unit was expanded to the size of a company on 1 July 2008, and its name was officially changed to Pathfinder Company (Parachute). 

This unit is influenced by the Pathfinder Platoon of the British Army.

Etymology 
The term 'Pandura' is an abbreviation of the Malay word 'Pandu Arah Udara', which translates directly to 'Pathfinder'.

Roles 

Initially, the Pandura Platoon's role was to provide 10 PARA BDE with navigation assistance and movement control, drops, plane flight, and landing in the exercise or operations area. Furthermore, they study, select, and mark out drop zones (DZ), landing zones (LZ), landing sites (LS), and plane landing points. Pandura paratroopers will infiltrate the target area and ensure its safety. There, they will provide navigation assistance so that the larger airborne force can accurately locate the landing area and be dropped as a cohesive force rather than in smaller teams. They can direct artillery, aircraft, and naval gun fire support (NGF).

Later, many other combat elements, such as snipers and combat intelligence, were added to the Pandura Platoon, and the platoon was expanded into a company size. Pandura paratroopers can act as a sniper team at the same time relaying information to aircraft pilots during operations. The Pandura, with its diverse abilities, serves as the 10 PARA BDE's "eyes and ears".

Pandura paratroopers were frequently chosen as instructors to teach jungle survival skills and combat tactics to local and international military units as an elite among the elite. The Pandura company, in close cooperation with the 10th Squadron (Parachute), Royal Army Engineers Regiment (The army's airborne sapper), is also responsible for supervising the Para Integrated All Weather Multi Mission Range (PIAW), a shooting range owned by the 10 PARA BDE.

Formations 
Because the unit is small and exclusive, there isn't much information available to the general public. However, only a few platoons in the Pandura company are well-known to the general public. The platoons are as follows:

Training 
The new members of the 10 PARA BDE's Pandura Company were chosen based on combat qualifications and parachute insertion skills, including static line and free fall. Pandura paratroopers must also be able to operate visual aids and electronic equipment, as well as provide ground-to-air communication and drive various off-road vehicles such as all-terrain vehicles and motocross. They must be able to interpret and value the weather, wind direction, conditions, and cloud height, as well as the visibility and safety of the landing area, in real time.

Pandura paratrooper must have 'Mobility': the ability to operate by air, land and sea; and 'Flexibility': the ability to operate on short notice in a variety of ways, to deal with any type of contingency, whether low or high level. The Pandura Company's capabilities were extended on 11 August 2021. They were trained to parachute into the sea and swim to the coastlines in order to get behind enemy lines.

Preparatory course — unit level (4 weeks) 
As a preparation for the actual pathfinder course conducted by the Special Warfare Training Centre (SWTC), the Pandura Company (Para) held a month of their own Pandura Course for the candidates.

Pathfinder course (7 weeks) 
This 7-week course, known as Kursus Pandu Arah in Malay, is offered at SWTC. Members who complete the Pandura course will receive a Pandura badge. The following conditions must be met in order to receive the Pathfinder badge:

 Pass basic parachute course
 Pass pathfinder course

Basic free fall course (6 weeks) 
Military free fall is the Pandura Company's specialty, which sets them apart from the other units in the 10 PARA BDE. This course is offered by SWTC and lasts 6 weeks.

Advanced training 
Among the advanced training options available to Pandura Company paratroopers are:

 Advanced free fall (HAHO/HALO)
Special reconnaissance
 Sniper
Close air support
Joint terminal attack controller

Killed in the line of duty

Equipment 

Aside from free-fall equipment, the Pandura paratroopers relied on vital navigation systems such as the Operational Parachutist Navigational System (OPANAS) and the Global Positioning System (GPS). They also use ground-to-air communication to communicate with aircraft for airborne force drops.

The Pandura paratroopers carry the same combat equipment as the other 10 PARA BDE's infantry units, with the exception of the sniper team.

References

Further reading 

Sjn Mohamad Solleh Jaapar (January 2005) "Platun Pandura - miliki kepakaran tersendiri", BTDM, vol. 134, pg. 33. Retrieved 3 April 2017
 Pbt Ainur Aisyah Yahaya, "Raja Muda Perlis Dipertonton Keupayaan 10 Bgd Para", bdtmonline.net, Published 29 October 2015. Retrieved 3 April 2017
 Khaleeq Shahzada Manja, "Wira Beret Semerah Hati", Majalah 3, TV3 (Malaysia), 30 May 2016. Retrieved 3 April 2017

Malaysian Army
Airborne units and formations